Vanier College, founded in 1966, was the second college to come into existence on the Keele Campus. The college is proudly named after former Governor General of Canada Georges Vanier. The mandated academic areas which Vanier College supports are: Business and Society, Business Economics, Children’s Studies, Classical Studies & Classics, Culture and Expression, Economics, Financial and Business Economics, Hellenic Studies, Humanities, Individualized Studies, Jewish Studies, Liberal Studies, Philosophy, Religious Studies, Social and Political Thought as well as all Undecided Majors in the Faculty of Liberal Arts and Professional Studies.

Vanier College is self-governed in its day-to-day activities by a master, the master’s office staff and students. Academic support is provided by an academic advisor and a team of peer advisors. Vanier Residence is managed by a residence life manager and a residence life team of dons, night porters and programmers, all of whom are upper-year students. Elected by, accountable to, and composed of students, Vanier College Council encourages community engagement through their social/cultural events programming. Affiliate organizations such as Vanier Athletics, the Vandoo, and Existere, provide additional alternative opportunities in sport and recreation, newspaper writing and creative arts and literature composition. Vanier College, like the other colleges, has fellows who are usually full-time academic faculty, administrative staff or outside affiliates who become members by invitation of the master. Distinguished researchers, award-winning lecturers, and internationally acclaimed writers are part of the community of Vanier Fellows.

The Banner

Jack Bush, one of Canada's leading abstract artists, designed Vanier's banner in 1971. Acrylic on canvas, the forms in this banner, which measures 101 cm x 80 cm - like most of those in his later paintings - are abstract. Bush originally studied at the Ontario College of Art in the late 1920s and had a number of solo shows throughout North America, including the Museum of Fine Arts in Boston, and the Nicholas Wilder Gallery in Los Angeles. He died in Toronto at the age of 68 in 1977.

See also 
List of colleges in Ontario
Higher education in Ontario

References

External links 

Vanier College
York University
York University Wiki Page

York University buildings